Sharada Gyan Peeth International School is a Malad based private co-educational English medium school. The School is providing syllabus based on   ICSE board  pattern.

References

 Oficial Website

International schools in Mumbai
Educational institutions established in 2006
2006 establishments in Maharashtra